The Races of Mankind is a series of 104 sculptures created for the Field Museum of Natural History in Chicago by sculptor Malvina Hoffman, representing the various races of humankind, and unveiled in 1933. Most of the sculptures are life-sized. The works were initially housed in Hall 3, the Chauncey Keep Memorial Hall ("The Hall of the Races of Mankind").

Hoffman wrote about her travels around the world to draw and model the various different types of people in her 1936 book Heads and Tales.

After a period of controversy as to whether or not the exhibit was racist, it was discontinued in 1969. For decades, some of the works could be found in various places in the museum. Others were in storage. In 2015, the Field Museum restored many of the sculptures, and in January 2016 the museum mounted a new exhibition, Looking at Ourselves: Rethinking the Sculptures of Malvina Hoffman.

See also
 Oscar Peschel, author of The Races of Man, an articulation of "scientific" racism

References

Art exhibitions in the United States
Sculpture series
Sculptures in Chicago